Emperor Xiaozong of Song (27 November 1127 – 28 June 1194), personal name Zhao Shen, courtesy name Yuanyong, was the 11th emperor of the Song dynasty of China and the second emperor of the Southern Song dynasty. He started his reign in 1162 when his adoptive father and predecessor, Emperor Gaozong, abdicated and passed the throne to him. Even though Emperor Gaozong became a Taishang Huang ("Retired Emperor") after his abdication, he remained the de facto ruler, so Emperor Xiaozong only took full power in 1187 after Emperor Gaozong's death. After ruling for about a year, Emperor Xiaozong followed in his predecessor's footsteps and abdicated in favour of his third son Zhao Dun (Emperor Guangzong), while he became Taishang Huang and still remained in power until his death in 1194.

He was the first descendant of Emperor Taizu to become emperor.

Names 
Zhao Shen's birth name was Zhao Bocong (趙伯琮). In March 1133, after Zhao Bocong entered the imperial palace, his name was changed to Zhao Yuan (趙瑗). In April 1160, after Zhao Yuan was adopted by Emperor Gaozong, his name was changed to Zhao Wei (趙瑋). In July 1162, when Zhao Wei became crown prince, his name was changed again to Zhao Shen (趙眘).

Zhao Shen was given the courtesy name Yuangui (元瑰) in May 1160. In July 1162, when he became crown prince, his courtesy name was changed to Yuanyong (元永).

Early life 
Zhao Shen was a seventh-generation descendant of Emperor Taizu, the founder and first emperor of the Song dynasty. He was the second son of Zhao Zicheng (趙子偁; died 1143), a sixth cousin of Emperor Gaozong, the 10th Song emperor. After the Jingkang Incident in 1127, Emperor Gaozong's father, eldest brother and most of his close relatives were taken prisoner by the Jurchen-led Jin Empire. As Emperor Gaozong's only son, Zhao Fu (趙旉), died prematurely around the age of two, the emperor ordered his officials to start searching for other living descendants of the imperial family. Zhao Shen was discovered and adopted by Emperor Gaozong in April 1160 as a son. Another relative, Zhao Qu was also adopted. In July 1162, Emperor Gaozong officially designated Zhao Shen as his crown prince and heir apparent. One of the main reasons Gaozong chose Shen over Qu was of Shen's virtue. It is said that Gaozong gave ten maids to Shen and Qu. In the end, Qu had touched every maid but Shen had not even touched one winning Gaozong's favor over Qu.

In 24 July 1162, Emperor Gaozong abdicated in favor of Emperor Xiaozong who became emperor although Emperor Gaozong retained power as Taishang Huang.

Reign 
During the reign of Emperor Xiaozong, the Chinese increased the number of trade missions that would dock at ports throughout the Indian Ocean, where Arab and Hindu influence was once predominant. Xiaozong also was responsible for Yue Fei's posthumous rehabilitation, clearing out the remnants of Qin Hui's faction in court, and stabilizing the economy making his reign the most powerful era of the Southern Song Dynasty and it's said he was the best ruler of the Southern Song dynasty.

Archery and equestrianism were required for non-military officials at the Military College in 1162 during Emperor Xiaozong's reign.

In 1165, he reached peace with the Jin Dynasty.

In 1187, the retired Emperor Gaozong died. Xiaozong was stricken with grief and retreated from governing, insisting on mourning Gaozong and stating that he would only rule for two more years. Xiaozong turned all government affairs to his son Zhao Dun.

In 1189, Emperor Xiaozong abdicated in favour of his son, Zhao Dun who took the throne as Emperor Guangzong. He then granted himself the title Taishang Huang and remained as the de facto ruler.

As Retired Emperor 
His daughter-in-law Empress Li reportedly attempted to keep Emperor Guangzong and his father (Xiaozong) separate, and often stopped the emperor from seeing his father. On one occasion, at the sickbed of the emperor, her father-in-law threatened to have her executed for not taking proper care of the monarch.

Retired Emperor Xiaozong fell ill in 1194 and was made worse when Emperor Guangzong refused to visit him. Xiaozong soon died. Emperor Guangzong refused to attend his funeral and as a result, was forced to give his throne to the deceased retired emperor's grandson Emperor Ningzong.

Family
Consorts and Issue:
 Empress Chengmu, of the Guo clan (1126–1156)
 Zhao Qi, Crown Prince Zhuangwen (1144–1167), first son
 Zhao Kai, Prince Weihuixian (1146–1180), second son
 Zhao Dun, Guangzong (1147–1200), third son
 Zhao Ke, Prince Shaodaosu, fourth son
 Empress Chenggong, of the Xia clan (d. 1167)
Unnamed daughter
Unnamed son
 Empress Chengsu, of the Xie clan (1132–1203), personal name Sufang
Noble Consort, of the Cai clan (贵妃 蔡氏)
Worthy Consort, of the  Li clan (贤妃 李氏)
 Unknown
 Princess Jia (d. 1162), first daughte
Second princess

Ancestry

See also
 Chinese emperors family tree (middle)
 List of emperors of the Song dynasty
 Architecture of the Song dynasty
 Culture of the Song dynasty
 Economy of the Song dynasty
 History of the Song dynasty
 Society of the Song dynasty
 Technology of the Song dynasty
 Jin–Song Wars

References

 

1127 births
1194 deaths
Monarchs who abdicated
Southern Song emperors
12th-century Chinese monarchs
People from Jiaxing